Hugh Alexander Stewart,  (September 29, 1871 – September 4, 1956) was a Canadian politician.

Born in Elizabethtown Township, Ontario, he was elected to the House of Commons of Canada representing the Ontario riding of Leeds in the 1921 federal election. A Conservative, he was re-elected in 1925, 1926, 1930, and 1935. He was defeated in 1940. From 1930 to 1935, he was the Minister of Public Works.

References

1871 births
1956 deaths
Conservative Party of Canada (1867–1942) MPs
Members of the House of Commons of Canada from Ontario
Members of the King's Privy Council for Canada